Bulkington was a railway station on the Trent Valley Line serving the village of Bulkington, Warwickshire, England. The station was opened along with the line in 1847, and was closed in 1931.

The station had three platforms; one side platform, and an island platform.

The platforms are long gone, the only surviving remnant of the station today is the former station building alongside the tracks, which is now a private house.

The station building was designed by John William Livock, who designed most of the stations on the Trent Valley Railway. It is one of the few remaining examples of original Livock designed station buildings on the Trent Valley Line.

References

External links

Bulkington station - Warwickshire railways

Railway stations in Great Britain opened in 1847
Railway stations in Great Britain closed in 1931
Disused railway stations in Warwickshire
Former London and North Western Railway stations
1847 establishments in England
John William Livock buildings
Bedworth